Says Seth is a humor book based on the humorous life observations of Seth Zenker published in 2013 by White Lightning Publishing.

The book pairs the cute and humorous comments of Seth Zenker at ages four to six with the more knowing, sarcastic and sometimes inappropriate after-comments of his father. The volume is broken into chapters grouping quotes with a similar topic, including Who I Am, Love & Hate, Advertising & Marketing, Work & Play, Body Parts, Bodily Functions, and others.

The book also includes drawings from the child that illustrate many of the chapter titles.

The book bears some similarity to Justin Halpern's Shit My Dad Says, but without the curse words.

References

2013 non-fiction books
Comedy books